Enable Networks Limited, trading as Enable, is a company based in Christchurch, New Zealand that installs a fibre broadband network in Christchurch and surrounding towns, and acts as a wholesaler for retail service providers (RSPs). It is fully owned by Christchurch City Holdings (CCHL), the investment arm of the Christchurch City Council.

History
Enable Networks was first launched in 2007 with funding from CCHL and a grant from the Ministry of Economic Development. Initially launched as Christchurch City Networks Limited (CCNL), in 2009 the company re-branded as Enable Networks and later simplified its trading name to Enable. In 2007, whether or not an area would be served by fibre broadband or not was mostly Telecom New Zealand's decision. As Telecom was trying to get as much out of its existing copper network and upgrades in Christchurch were uncertain, Christchurch City Council decided to set up its own fibre broadband company through its trading arm, Christchurch City Holdings. The initial outcome was a small  network that served 60 schools, health providers and businesses.

There were plans to double the length of the network within three years, but the National Government announced the Ultra-Fast Broadband initiative in 2009. Enable Networks and Chorus Limited, a Telecom subsidiary, tendered for the work. Negotiations with the government took one year and were completed in April 2011, when Enable Networks was assigned the network rollout for Christchurch, Rangiora, Kaiapoi, Woodend, Lincoln, Prebbleton, and Rolleston. Enable partnered with the government's Crown Fibre Holdings on the project, with the city's cost projected to be NZ$203m, and the Crown's cost estimated to be NZ$170. The overall costs were later revised to NZ$440m, with the Crown's contribution lowered to NZ$140m, but their equity stake in Enable Networks was converted to an interest-free loan in June 2016. Enable Networks does not expect to make a profit prior to 2021.

The company's first employee was Steve Fuller, who had previously been an executive manager at Telecom. Fuller is to this day Enable Networks' chief executive. Construction under the contract with the Crown started in November 2011. The 50% completion mark was hit in October 2014. In April 2015, uptake was just under 15% of the possible connections. By mid-2016, 67% of the network had been built. Of the 118,000 homes and businesses that could connect to the network, 22% have chosen to do so, and this update is above the expectations.

By July 2017, Enable announced over 50,000 of the 150,000 homes and businesses that could connect, had chosen to do so.

The government's target date for the rollout is 2019, but Enable announced in October 2014 that it will deliver the network a year earlier, i.e. by 31 December 2018.

In May 2018 Enable Networks completed its network build programme to Christchurch. Also completing additional areas of Kennedys Bush, Ohoka, Tuahiwi, Clearwater and Tai Tapu.

Enable Networks used Transfield as its key contractor for the network build, but there were serious tensions between the companies. The contract agreement was terminated and instead, an alliance between the companies was negotiated instead.

References

Government-owned companies of New Zealand
Companies based in Christchurch